Eakle may refer to:

Eakle, West Virginia, a community in Clay County, West Virginia
Charlie Eakle, an American former baseball second baseman
Matt Eakle, a jazz flutist